The Alliance for Surgery and Anesthesia Presence is a multidisciplinary society of surgeons, anesthesiologists, obstetricians and public health specialists organized to improve the delivery of surgical care, particularly in low and middle income countries. The body, named the Burden of Surgical Disease Working Group at its founding in 2007, was renamed in 2010. It became an international society in 2013 under the umbrella of the International Surgery Society.

History

The Burden of Surgical Disease Working Group was co-founded by Kelly McQueen, MD, MPH and Doruk Ozdigez, MD, MPH, originally convening a small group of colleagues committed to documenting the important role of surgery and safe anesthesia to global public health through the international literature.  The initial working group represented many academic groups engaged in international surgical delivery, and included Haile Debas, MD (surgery), Skip Burkle, MD (public health), Dean Jamison, PhD (economist), Steve Bickler, MD (surgery), Richard Gosselin, MD (orthopedic surgery), Charlie Mock, MD (trauma surgery), John Meara, MD (surgery), and Robert Riviello, MD, MPH (surgery).  Central to the initial mission of the group was autonomy from any one university or organization and collaboration with international groups and individuals representing the great unmet need of surgery and anesthesia in low and middle income countries.

The working group has collaborated with global health institutions such as the Lancet Commission on Global Surgery, World Health Organization's Global Initiative for Emergency and Essential Surgical Care, The World Federation of Societies of Anaesthesiologists, The President and Fellows of Harvard College, The American College of Surgeons, Operation Giving Back , the Disease Control Priorities Network, and the International Surgical Society. The World Journal of Surgery became the official journal of the working group early in the group’s tenure, and has published an abundance of data and reports on rural and international surgery.   The inaugural meeting of the Burden of Surgical Disease Working Group was hosted by the University of Washington in 2008.  Subsequent meetings were hosted by The American College of Surgeons, Operation Giving Back in 2009 and Vanderbilt University in 2010.  During the 2010 Burden of Surgical Disease Working Group meeting in Nashville, TN, the group was renamed as the Alliance of Surgery and Anesthesia Presence Today with the support of Bob Isherwood.

Leadership

The Alliance for Surgery and Anesthesia Presence became the 6th Integrated Society of the International Society of Surgery on Aug 25, 2013.  Under the leadership of Kelly McQueen, MD, MPH, President, Steve Bickler, MD, Vice President, Kathleen Casey, MD, Secretary, Russell Gruen, MD, Treasurer, and David Watters, MD, acting Past-President, the first international, multidisciplinary society committed to surgery and safe anesthesia in Low and middle income countries continues growing and advocating for improvements in delivery of surgical and anesthesia care. The members of the Alliance for Surgery and Anesthesia Presence have contributed more than 100 peer-reviewed articles to the global surgical literature in journals such as the World Journal of Surgery, online forums like the World Health Organization Bulletin, and more.

References

External links
 Official Website

Medical and health organisations based in Switzerland